The 2016 Texas Roadhouse 200 was the 20th stock car race of the 2016 NASCAR Camping World Truck Series, the first race of the Round of 6, and the 18th iteration of the event. The race was held on Saturday, October 29, 2016, in Ridgeway, Virginia, at Martinsville Speedway, a 0.526-mile (0.847 km) permanent paper-clip shaped racetrack. The race took the scheduled 200 laps to complete. Johnny Sauter, driving for GMS Racing, would hold off a fast-charging Chase Elliott with 19 laps to go, and earned his 12th career NASCAR Camping World Truck Series win, and his second of the season. He would also earn an automatic spot in the championship 4. Elliott mainly dominated the race, leading 105 laps. To fill out the podium, John Hunter Nemechek, driving for NEMCO Motorsports, would finish in 3rd, respectively.

This race would also make history, as Harrison Burton and Kyle Donahue became the first drivers born in the 2000s decade and the 21st century to race in a NASCAR national series event.

Background 

Martinsville Speedway is a NASCAR-owned stock car racing short track in Ridgeway, Virginia, just south of Martinsville. At  in length, it is the shortest track in the NASCAR Cup Series. The track was also one of the first paved oval tracks in stock car racing, being built in 1947 by partners H. Clay Earles, Henry Lawrence, and Sam Rice, nearly a year before NASCAR was officially formed. It is also the only race track that has been on the NASCAR circuit from its beginning in 1948. Along with this, Martinsville is the only oval track on the NASCAR circuit to have asphalt surfaces on the straightaways and concrete to cover the turns.

Entry list 

 (R) denotes rookie driver.
 (i) denotes driver who is ineligible for series driver points.

Practice

First practice 
The first practice session was held on Friday, October 28, at 12:30 pm EST, and would last for 55 minutes.

Final practice 
The final practice session was held on Friday, October 28, at 2:30 pm EST, and would last for 1 hour and 50 minutes.

Qualifying 
Qualifying was held on Saturday, October 29, at 10:15 am EST. Since Martinsville Speedway is under 1.5 miles (2.4 km) in length, the qualifying system is a multi-car system that included three rounds. The first round was 15 minutes, where every driver would be able to set a lap within the 15 minutes. Then, the second round would consist of the fastest 24 cars in Round 1, and drivers would have 10 minutes to set a lap. Round 3 consisted of the fastest 12 drivers from Round 2, and the drivers would have 5 minutes to set a time. Whoever was fastest in Round 3 would win the pole. 

Brad Foy, Casey Smith, Kyle Soper, and Donnie Levister would fail to qualify.

Full qualifying results

Race results

Standings after the race 

Drivers' Championship standings

Note: Only the first 8 positions are included for the driver standings.

References 

NASCAR races at Martinsville Speedway
October 2016 sports events in the United States
2016 in sports in Virginia